Valter Mutt (born August 4, 1955) is a Swedish politician and former parliamentarian. He served in the Riksdag from 2010 to 2018, representing the Green Party.

In 2020 Mutt jointed the Left Party.

References

Members of the Riksdag from the Green Party
Members of the Riksdag 2010–2014
Members of the Riksdag 2014–2018
Living people
1955 births
Place of birth missing (living people)